Cholestenol is a sterol that has been found in the skins of rats. It can be converted to cholesterol in mammals. Delta-7-cholestenol is also known as lathosterol.

References 

Cholestanes